EDGAR, the Electronic Data Gathering, Analysis, and Retrieval is an internal database system that performs automated collection, validation, indexing, acceptance, and forwarding of submissions by companies and others who are required by law to file forms with the U.S. Securities and Exchange Commission (the "SEC"). The database contains a wealth of information about the Commission and the securities industry which is freely available to the public via the Internet.

In September 2017, SEC Chairman Clayton revealed the database had been hacked and that companies' data may have been used by criminals for insider trading.

Filings 
Not all SEC filings by public companies are available on EDGAR. Development began in 1983, and companies were phased in to EDGAR filing over a three-year period, ending 6 May, 1996. As of that date, all public domestic companies were required to submit their filings via EDGAR, except for hardcopy paper filings, which were allowed under a hardship exemption. Third-party filings with respect to these companies, such as tender offers and Schedule 13D filings, are also filed via EDGAR.

The vast majority of documents are now filed electronically, with over 3,000 filings per day.

As of 4 November, 2002, the SEC required all foreign companies and foreign governments to file their documents via EDGAR. Prior to that time, electronic filing by foreign companies also was voluntary.

Actual annual reports to shareholders (except in the case of mutual fund companies) need not be submitted on EDGAR, although some companies do so voluntarily. However, the annual report on Form 10-K is required to be filed on EDGAR. As of March 31, 2018, there are over 12 million filings filed to SEC EDGAR.

See also
 Securities and Exchange Commission
 Central Index Key
 Electronic Municipal Market Access system (EMMA), providing disclosure information for the municipal securities market
 Form N-1A
 List of company registers

Other countries' equivalents to EDGAR
 Federal Public Service Economy (Belgium)
 SEDAR, Canada
 Central Business Register (Denmark)
 Companies Registration Office (Ireland)
 Kamer van Koophandel, Netherlands
 Brønnøysund Register Centre, Norway
 Comisión Nacional del Mercado de Valores, Spain
 Companies House, United Kingdom
 Securities and Exchange Board of India, India
 FinancialReports, Europe

References

External links
 

U.S. Securities and Exchange Commission
Government databases in the United States